Oxyopsis gracilis, common name South American green mantis, is a species of praying mantis native to South America.  It is a medium sized mantis with adult females reaching 3” in length and adult males growing to about 1.5” in length.  Individuals of these species are usually bright green.

See also
List of mantis genera and species

References

Mantidae
Mantodea of South America
Insects described in 1914